List of Turkish Billionaires is an annual ranking by documented net worth of the wealthiest billionaires in Turkey, compiled and published in March annually by the American business magazine Forbes.

Methodology 
Each year, Forbes employs a team of more than 50 reporters from a variety of countries to track the activity of the world's wealthiest individuals. Preliminary surveys are sent to those who may qualify for the list. According to Forbes, they received three types of responses – some people try to inflate their wealth, others cooperate but leave out details, and some refuse to answer any questions. Business deals are then scrutinized and estimates of valuable assets – land, homes, vehicles, artwork, etc. – are made. Interviews are conducted to vet the figures and improve the estimate of an individual's holdings. Finally, positions in a publicly traded stock are priced to market on a date roughly a month before publication. Privately held companies are priced by the prevailing price-to-sales or price-to-earnings ratios. Known debt is subtracted from assets to get a final estimate of an individual's estimated worth in United States dollars. Since stock prices fluctuate rapidly, an individual's true wealth and ranking at the time of publication may vary from their situation when the list was compiled.

Family fortunes dispersed over a large number of relatives are included only if those individuals' holdings are worth more than a billion dollars. However, when a living individual has dispersed his or her wealth to immediate family members, it is included under a single listing provided that individual is still living. Royal families and dictators that have their wealth contingent on a position are always excluded from these lists.

Annual rankings
The rankings are published annually in March, so the net worths listed are snapshots taken at that time.

Ledger

2019 Turkish Billionaires List

2017 Turkish Billionaires List

See also
 The World's Billionaires
 List of countries by the number of billionaires

References

Turkish
Net worth
 
People by net worth